The Gila Valley Arizona Temple is a temple of the Church of Jesus Christ of Latter-day Saints (LDS Church) in the town of Central between the communities of Pima and Thatcher in Arizona. The temple was dedicated on May 23, 2010, following an open house period from April 23 to May 15.

History
The announcement of the temple on April 26, 2008 came concurrently with the Gilbert Arizona Temple, and together were the first new temples announced since Thomas S. Monson assumed responsibilities as the president of the LDS Church.

Local church leadership announced on September 21, 2008, that the temple would be built on church owned property adjacent to U.S. Route 70 in the unincorporated community of Central. A petition to grant an exception to building height restrictions to accommodate a  steeple for the temple was given a favorable recommendation by the Graham County Planning and Zoning Commission and was subsequently approved by the county board of supervisors on October 20.

A groundbreaking and site dedication ceremony took place on February 14, 2009, officially beginning the construction process.  The structure was completed on September 22 with the placement of the Angel Moroni statue on the temple's steeple. Additional site improvements, including landscaping and interior work, were completed in early 2010.

The new temple serves the significant Latter-day Saint population in the eastern part of Arizona's Gila River Valley, who previously had to travel to the Mesa Arizona Temple, 150 miles to the west. The area has a historical significance to the LDS Church; Thatcher, which was founded by Mormon pioneers in 1881, was home to former LDS Church president Spencer W. Kimball during his youth in the early part of the 1900s. Speculation that the area would be home to a temple was made as early as 1882, when Jesse N. Smith predicted that a temple would be built in Thatcher.

During remarks prior to the dedicatory prayer, Monson noted that an anonymous benefactor, a woman from the area, had given $500,000 to allow the temple to be adorned with much original artwork.

In 2020, the Gila Valley Arizona Temple was closed in response to the coronavirus pandemic.

See also

 Comparison of temples of The Church of Jesus Christ of Latter-day Saints
 List of temples of The Church of Jesus Christ of Latter-day Saints
 List of temples of The Church of Jesus Christ of Latter-day Saints by geographic region
 Temple architecture (Latter-day Saints)
 The Church of Jesus Christ of Latter-day Saints in Arizona

References

External links
 
Gila Valley Arizona Temple Official site
Gila Valley Arizona Temple at ChurchofJesusChristTemples.org

21st-century Latter Day Saint temples
Buildings and structures in Graham County, Arizona
Religious buildings and structures completed in 2010
Temples (LDS Church) in Arizona
Tourist attractions in Graham County, Arizona
2010 establishments in Arizona